TCW may refer to:

 "My T.C.W.", a season two episode of the TV series Scrubs
 Tactical Communications Wing, one of two wings of No. 90 Signals Unit RAF
 TCW Group, an asset management firm based in Los Angeles, California
 Star Wars: The Clone Wars (2008-2020), a computer-animated television series part of the larger Star Wars franchise
 Thomas Calhoun Walker, lawyer and education advocate who lived at the T. C. Walker House
 Thomas Chatterton Williams, an American author
 Thomas Cook Airlines Belgium (ICAO code: TCW), a Belgian leisure airline owned by the Thomas Cook Group
 Traverse City West Senior High School, a secondary school in Michigan.
 Trican Well Service (TSX ticker: TCW), a provider of oilfield services
 Tung Chung West station, Hong Kong (MTR station code: TCW)
 Tocumwal Airport, IATA airport code "TCW"